Concerned Scientists may refer to:

Union of Concerned Scientists
Committee of Concerned Scientists
Wentworth Group of Concerned Scientists